Luna, officially the Municipality of Luna, is a 5th class municipality in the province of Isabela, Philippines. According to the 2020 census, it has a population of 20,697 people.

Luna was formerly known as Antatet. The municipality celebrates Bato Arts festival during the 2014 Bambanti Festival.

Geography

Barangays
Luna is politically subdivided into 19 barangays. These barangays are headed by elected officials: Barangay Captain, Barangay Council, whose members are called Barangay Councilors. All are elected every three years.

Climate

Demographics

Economy

Government

Local government
The municipality is governed by a mayor designated as its local chief executive and by a municipal council as its legislative body in accordance with the Local Government Code. The mayor, vice mayor, and the councilors are elected directly by the people through an election which is being held every three years.

Elected officials

Congress representation
Luna, belonging to the fifth legislative district of the province of Isabela, currently represented by Hon. Faustino Michael Carlos T. Dy III.

Education
The Schools Division of Isabela governs the town's public education system. The division office is a field office of the DepEd in Cagayan Valley region. The office governs the public and private elementary and public and private high schools throughout the municipality.

See also
List of renamed cities and municipalities in the Philippines

References

External links
Municipal Profile at the National Competitiveness Council of the Philippines
Luna at the Isabela Government Website
Local Governance Performance Management System
[ Philippine Standard Geographic Code]
Philippine Census Information
Municipality of Luna

Municipalities of Isabela (province)